Tuancheng, literally "Circular Wall", "Round Fort", or "Round City", may refer to:

 Tuancheng Fortress (Chinese: t , s , p Tuánchéng Yǎnwǔtīng) in Beijing, China
 Tuancheng Island (t , s , p Tuánchéngdǎo) in Kunming Lake at the Summer Palace in Beijing, China
 Round City (t , s , p Tuánchéng), a former island in Beihai Park in Beijing, China
 Tuancheng Township (t , s , p Tuánchéngxiāng) in Lushan County near Pindingshan, Henan, in China